Alois Friedrich Rogenhofer (22 December 1831, in Vienna – 15 January 1897, in Vienna) was an Austrian entomologist. He was a curator at the Naturhistorisches Museum in Vienna, where he was the first keeper of the Lepidoptera. Rogenhofer was mainly interested in Lepidoptera, and Hymenoptera.

Beside him Josef Mann (1804-1889) worked as a keen technician and collector for the benefits of the museum. Mann described many species of Lepidoptera new to science focussing on Microlepidoptera.

Works
 with Cajetan Freiherr von Felder and Rudolf Felder Reise Fregatte Novara. Lepidoptera.Three volumes (1865-1867).

Sources 
 Anon. 1897 [Rogenhofer, A. F.]: Entomologist's Monthly Magazine (3) 33:108

External links
 

Hymenopterists
Austrian lepidopterists
Scientists from Vienna
1831 births
1897 deaths